Ctenopelta is a genus of sea snails, marine gastropod mollusks in the family Peltospiridae.

Species
Species within the genus Ctenopelta include:
 Ctenopelta porifera Warén & Bouchet, 1993

References

 Warén A. & Bouchet P. (1993) New records, species, genera, and a new family of gastropods from hydrothermal vents and hydrocarbon seeps. Zoologica Scripta 22: 1-90.

Peltospiridae
Monotypic gastropod genera